Goniocarsia electrica is a species of moth in the family Erebidae. It is found in North America.

The MONA or Hodges number for Goniocarsia electrica is 8580.

References

Further reading

 
 
 

Eulepidotinae
Articles created by Qbugbot
Moths described in 1894